Segovia is a city in the autonomous community of Castile and León, Spain. It is the capital and most populated municipality of the Province of Segovia.

Segovia is in the Inner Plateau (Meseta central), near the northern slopes of the Sistema Central range and on a bend of the Eresma river.

The city is famous for its historic buildings including three main landmarks: its midtown Roman aqueduct, its cathedral (one of the last ones to be built in Europe following a Gothic style), and the medieval castle, which served as one of the templates for Walt Disney's Cinderella Castle. The city center was declared a World Heritage Site by UNESCO in 1985.

Etymology
The name of Segovia is of Celtiberian origin. The name of "Segovia" is mentioned by Livy in the context of the Sertorian War.

Under the Romans and Moors, the city was called Sego([u])via (Ptolomeo ii. 6. § 56) and  respectively.

Geography

Location

Segovia is located on the plains of Old Castile, near Valladolid and the Spanish capital, Madrid.

Segovia is one of nine provinces that make up the autonomous region of Castile and León. Burgos and Valladolid lie to the north, Ávila to the west, Madrid to the south, and Soria to the east.

The town lies on the main route of the Camino de Santiago de Madrid.

Climate
The climate is hot-summer Mediterranean (Csa in the Köppen climate classification) near the boundaries of Csb and BSk, resulting from the high altitude and the distance from the coast. The annual precipitation range from 400 to 500 mm per year in the lower plains, and can reach above 1000 mm in the nearby mountainous area of Sierra de Guadarrama, as rainfall and snowfall is more frequent up the mountains. Decent showers coming from summer thunderstorms help the mountainous area of the province to be rainier than average than most of the central Spanish plateau, which gives the area lush vegetation. All of this make the province a damp corner in the context of the region. The predominant forms of vegetation in the mountainous areas include pine, evergreen, oak, beech and juniper.

Population centers
Aside from the main city, there are a number of other villages within the municipality of Segovia.
 Fuentemilanos
 Hontoria
 Madrona
 Revenga, established in 1983 as a "minor local entity", a category of sub-municipal entities in Spain.
 Zamarramala
 Torredondo
 Perogordo

History

The first recorded mention of a settlement in what is today Segovia was a Celtic possession. Control later passed into the hands of the Romans. The city is a possible site of the battle in 75 BC where Quintus Caecilius Metellus Pius was victorious over Quintus Sertorius and Hirtuleius.  Hirtuleius died in the fighting.

During the Roman period the settlement belonged to one of numerous contemporary Latin convents. It is believed that the city was abandoned after the Islamic invasion of Spain centuries later. After the conquest of Toledo by Alfonso VI of León and Castile, the son of King Alfonso VI, Segovia was resettled with Christians from the north of the Iberian peninsula and beyond the Pyrenees, providing it with a significant sphere of influence whose boundaries crossed the Sierra de Guadarrama and the Tagus.

Segovia's position on trading routes made it an important centre of trade in wool and textiles. The end of the Middle Ages saw something of a golden age for Segovia, with a growing Jewish population and the creation of a foundation for a powerful cloth industry. Several splendid works of Gothic architecture were also completed during this period. Notably, Isabella I was proclaimed queen of Castile in the church of San Miguel de Segovia on December 13, 1474.

Segovienne was a local flannel cloth used for upholstery in the 14th to 17th centuries. It was a twilled weave structure with a hairy surface produced by using Spanish wool.

Like most Castilian textile centres, Segovia joined the Revolt of the Comuneros under the command of Juan Bravo. Despite the defeat of the Communities, the city's resultant economic boom continued into the sixteenth century, its population rising to 27,000 in 1594. Then, as well as almost all the cities of Castile, Segovia entered a period of decline. Only a century later in 1694, the population had been reduced to only 8,000 inhabitants. In the early eighteenth century, Segovia attempted to revitalize its textile industry, with little success. In the second half of the century, Charles III made another attempt to revive the region's commerce; it took the form of the Royal Segovian Wool Manufacturing Company (1763). However, the lack of competitiveness of production caused the crown withdraw its sponsorship in 1779. In 1764, the Royal School of Artillery, the first military academy in Spain, was opened. This academy remains present in the city today. In 1808, Segovia was sacked by French troops during the War of Independence. During the First Carlist War, troops under the command of Don Carlos, Count of Molina unsuccessfully attacked the city. During the nineteenth and first half of the twentieth century, Segovia experienced a demographic recovery that was the result of relative economic stability.

Demographics
The population growth experienced during the nineteenth century accelerated steadily beginning around 1920: 16,013 inhabitants that year, 33,360 in 1960, 53,237 in 1981. Since the 1980s growth has slowed markedly: 55,586 in 2004 and 56,047 in 2007.

As of 1 January 2019, there were 11% inhabitants foreigners – 4.478% coming from any other country of Europe, 2.37% being Africans, 3.7% being Americans, and 0.435% being Asians.

Heritage

World Heritage City

In 1985 the old city of Segovia and its Aqueduct were declared World Heritage Sites by UNESCO. The old city contains a multitude of historic buildings both civil and religious, including a large number of buildings of Jewish origin, notably within the old Jewish Quarter. One of the most historically important Jewish sites is the Jewish cemetery, .
Among the most important monuments in the city are:

The Aqueduct of Segovia, located in Plaza del Azoguejo, is the defining historical feature of the city, dating from the late 1st or early 2nd century AD. Like a number of other aqueducts in Spain, Segovia's Roman-built aqueduct receives attention for being one of the “extraordinary engineering accomplishments” existing in the country, wrote Alejandro Lapunzina in Reference Guides to National Architecture: Architecture of Spain.  It is still used to deliver drinking water.  “The aqueduct of Segovia is – because of its long span, architectural beauty, uncharacteristic slenderness, and dramatic presence in the center of a dense urban fabric – the most impressive Roman structure in Spain, and one of the most famous among the numerous aqueducts built by the Romans throughout their vast Empire,” Lapunzina wrote. It consists of about 25,000 granite blocks held together without any mortar, and spans 818 meters with more than 170 arches, the highest being 29 metres high.

The Alcazar of Segovia, the royal palace built on a stone peninsula between the rivers Eresma and Clamores, is documented for the first time in 1122, although it may have existed earlier. It was one of the favored residences of the kings of Castile, built in the transition from Romanesque architecture to Gothic and Mudéjar. The building is structured around two courtyards and has two towers, and a keep. It was a favourite residence of Alfonso X the Wise and Henry IV, and Isabella the Catholic was crowned Queen of Castile in Segovia's Plaza Mayor. Devastated by a fire in 1862, it was later rebuilt. It now houses the General Militar de Segovia archive and museum of the Royal School of Artillery, managed by the Board of the Alcazar.

The Segovia Cathedral, the last Gothic cathedral built in Spain. It is considered a masterpiece of Basque-Castilian Gothic architecture and is known as "The Lady of Cathedrals." Juan Gil de Hontañón, Rodrigo Gil de Hontañón, and other masters of Spanish architecture worked on the construction. It was consecrated in 1768 and is 105 meters long, 50 metres wide and 33 m high in the nave, has 18 chapels and has three doors: El Perdón, San Frutos and San Geroteo.
The Walls of Segovia existed when Alfonso VI of León and Castile retook the city from the Arabs. Alfonso had them enlarged, and also increased its perimeter to 3 kilometres, with eight towers, five gates, and several doors. It was built mainly of granite blocks but also reused gravestones from the old Roman necropolis. The wall encircles the historic quarter and currently has three gates: San Cebrián; Santiago, built in the Mudéjar style; and San Andrés, gateway to the Jewish quarter; and the breaches of Consuelo, San Juan, the Sun, and the Moon.

Religious architecture

Churches and chapels 

The city maintains an important collection of Romanesque churches of both stone and brick, which include the churches of San Esteban, San Millán, San Martín, la Santísima Trinidad, San Andrés, San Clemente, Santos Justo y Pastor, Iglesia de la Vera Cruz (Order of Malta), and San Salvador.

The old main synagogue is a former synagogue, converted into a convent after the expulsion of the Jews from Spain in 1492.

Monasteries and convents 
The city of Segovia preserved also several monasteries and convents with active religious life:

 The Monastery of Saint Mary of Parral with the cloistered monks of the Order of Saint Jerome
 The Monastery of the Humble Incarnation with the cloistered nuns of the Order of Saint Augustine
 The Monastery of the Immaculate Conception with the cloistered Conceptionist nuns
 The Monastery of San Vicente el Real with the cloistered nuns of the Cistercian Order
 The Monastery of San Antonio el Real with the Poor Clare Sisters of the Order of Saint Claire
 The Convent of Saint John of the Cross with the Discalced Carmelite friars
 The Convent of Saint Joseph with the cloistered Discalced Carmelite nuns
 The Convent of Corpus Christi with the Poor Clare Sisters of the Order of Saint Claire
 The Convent of Santo Domingo el Real with the cloistered nuns of the Dominican Order
 The Convent of Saint John of God with the Franciscan Sisters of the Third Order of Saint Francis
 The Convent of Santa Cruz la Real (occupied by IE University).

Civil architecture

 The Ayala Berganza Castilian Palace dates from the late 15th century. Due to a multiple murder that happened in the late 19th century is known by Segovia as "the house of the crime."
Casa del Sello on San Francisco Street
Casa-Museo del Torreón de Lozoya in the Plaza de San Martín
Casa del Siglo XV (or of Juan Bravo)
House of the Count Alpuente, the Casa de los Picos and others in the Calle Real
La Taberna Rubi, the oldest tavern in the city
The Casa de la Moneda, a former mint included in the "production and manufacturing" theme of the European Route of Industrial Heritage.

Urban sculpture

Urban Sculpture in Segovia stars works depicting illustrious figures linked to the city, which wanted to pay tribute in this way, but we can also find several pictures of a religious nature. One of the most iconic sculptures of the Loba Capitolina sits in front of the aqueduct. A copy of the Capitoline wolf is preserved in the Capitoline Museum and was a gift that Rome gave to the city in 1974 during the events of the bimillennial anniversary of the aqueduct.

Until a few decades ago, a monument dedicated to the artist Daniel Zuloaga, which was installed in 1924, could be seen in the Plaza de la Merced, but it was relocated to the Plaza de Colmenares. Currently located in the center of the Plaza de la Merced, looking towards the church of San Andrés is a bust of the poet Rubén Darío, sculptor Santiago de Santiago, which was donated by the Nicaragua government to the city in 1973. Letters related to the bust are also found in the Promenade Lounge, the famous poet José Rodas was first installed in 1927 in the plaza of the gardens, and moved to its present site in 1960 by the Segovian sculptor Aniceto Marinas. It could not miss this literary group a tribute to Antonio Machado, poet Segovia made his refuge from 1919 to 1932, the sculpture as it could be otherwise is located in the garden of his home museum, and was done by Emiliano Barral.

Religious figures such as Domingo de Soto, Pius XII, Saint Anthony Mary Claret, Saint John of the Cross have their place within the city urban sculpture, the first work of Ortega and the rest of José María García Moro, sculptor prosperous Segovia who must also be a Monument to the Youth located in the Plaza del Conde de Cheste. Other teachers who also paid tribute to his work a few peasants have been both recognized in any street or town square, as is the case for Aniceto Marinas, who dedicated a monument in 1943 his friend and partner Mariano Benlliure.

In the field of arms found the monument to Daoíz and Velarde, Aniceto Marinas work. By the same author is the List of people associated with the comunero Juan Bravo sculpture, made in 1921 and located in the heart of the city in the Square of the Sirens, the name given to two statues that top the stairs and representing these mythological beings, made by Francisco Bellver in 1852. Other sculptures in the city are devoted to medical Andrés Laguna made by the segovian Florentino Trapero and marina located in Plaza de los Huertos, the bust of Lope de la Calle Martín, president of the Provincial council that made Emiliano Barral and can be seen in the square of San Facundo or the monument "El Favorito", by Toribio García de Andrés in the early 20th century.

In addition to this series of monuments and sculptures are hidden in the corners of the city some other religious images that are worth mentioning. The most significant of these is the Virgin of the Aqueduct, located in the central niche of the monument has since the Plaza del Azoguejo and it was already in the 16th century, as remember Colmenares in his history of Segovia. The cast of virgins are also members of the Fuencisla in Velarde Street, the los Remedios in front of San Juan Gate, the Socorro at the San Andrés Gate or del Carmen on the street of its own name, among others.

Parks and gardens

 The Alcazar Gardens was built in the plaza where the Old Cathedral and the Episcopal Palace existed before and was created on the occasion of the marriage of Philip II to Anne of Austria in 1570, removing the ruins that still existed. This, however, was not fully realized until the visit of Ferdinand VI in the 18th century. Between 1816 and 1817 the first trees were planted, and enclosed with the fence that currently exists. They were destroyed by the fire suffered by the palace in 1862, and recovered again in 1882.
 The Garden of la Merced was the first public garden carried out by the city within the city walls. Named after the former Mercy convent that was located in the same place and came into existence in the middle 19th century with the planting of trees and installation of a fountain, later replaced by the current, broader and statelier plaza. There is also a child's playground available.
 Paseo del Salón is one of the oldest gardens in the city, since it was created in 1786 by the Economic Society of Friends of the Country of Segovia, and two years later they began planting trees. In 1846 he set up various sources and replanted again in different species.
 Jardinillos of San Roque, situated along the so-called "Paseo Nuevo" were open to the public in 1872, but ten years before a public fountain was placed in them. In 1943 they were the place where stood a pavilion dedicated to the Feria de Muestras, the building still stands and is one of the characteristic features of the gardens.
Missionaries, The Garden of los Cañuelos
 The Gardens of los Huertos are named for the orchards occupy a premonstratensian friary. After the removal of the convent in 1836 with the first disentailment laws, the city claimed ownership of the land, a fact that occurred in 1897. In 1901 he began planting trees and structuring of the gardens, which has gradually been restored today.
 Alameda del Eresma
 Alameda de la Fuencisla
 Fromkes Garden
 Garden of la Plaza del Conde Alpuente
 Garden of la Plaza de Colmenares
 Garden of St. Augustine
 Parque de la Albuera
 Parque de la Dehesa
 Pinarillo de la Cuesta de los Hoyos
 Clamores Valley

Economy
The economy of Segovia revolves around metallurgy, agriculture, furniture, construction and, particularly, tourism. The town itself plays host to thousands of day-visitors from Madrid each year due to its popular attractions.

Transport
Segovia is served by the Autopista AP-61 which opened in 2004. Segovia-Guiomar railway station provides a rail connection to Madrid Chamartín and Valladolid-Campo Grande via the AVE network's Madrid–León high-speed rail line.

Education
The city of Segovia is home to a large number of primary schools and secondary schools, the oldest of which (IES Andrés Laguna, founded in 1841) having been officially declared "of cultural interest." A high proportion of the student population attends state primary and secondary schools, while private schooling in Segovia is mostly religious in nature.

Regarding higher education, Segovia's premier institution is IE University, a business-oriented undergraduate university, building upon Instituto Empresa's successful MBA program at Madrid-based IE Business School. Also present is the Segovia campus of the University of Valladolid, offering entrance into careers in computer engineering, law, journalism, advertising and teaching.

Culture

Museums
 Gastronomic Museum of Segovia
 Museum of Segovia.
 Museum of Contemporary Art 'Esteban Vicente'
 Museum of the Bishop's Palace
 Museum del Pasado
 Museum of the Cathedral
 Museum Zuloaga
 House-Museum of Antonio Machado
 Museum of the Rodera-Robles Foundation
 Museum of Witch Craft
 Museum of Arms
 Museum of the Walls of Segovia
 Jewish Center

MUCES

MUCES (Muestra de Cine Europeo Ciudad de Segovia) is the Spanish acronym to The City of Segovia Festival of European Cinema, an annual film festival which takes place in the city since 2006, usually in November. It gives the wider public a chance to get to know quality European cinema and, above all, it offers the general public an opportunity to see European films which have not yet been commercially screened in Spain, but have been very successful with critics and audiences in their own countries. "My Cat Lives in Segovia" is one of the films presented to the audience.

Festivities

 San Lorenzo (around August 10). It is the feast of one of the neighborhoods in the city.
 Fairs and Festivals of San Juan and San Pedro (late June). These feasts have been held since the 15th century.
 San Frutos (October 25): Patron saint of Segovia. At mid-morning the Carol of San Frutos is sung in the cathedral, after which there are often various activities in the Plaza Mayor, as a proclamation, a concert by the Band of the Segovian Musical Union, mycology exhibition, etc. In recent years, following the established tradition of drawn traditions of the sleeve, Segovia's pastry chefs have invented a dessert of the saint. On the last night to San Frutos the segovian congregate at the image of the saint who is at the door of the cathedral to see him turning the page of the book that she holds.
 Virgin of the Fuencisla (September 25): Patronenss of Segovia. The biggest celebration day takes place during the last Sunday of the month. Two Thursdays before the Virgin up from his sanctuary in the Alameda of the Fuencisla to the cathedral to start the novena (his arrival at the Plaza Mayor is one of the most specific one can be found in Segovia, is typical to make it when the clock of the Town Hall rings). During the nine days following celebrates the novena in the cathedral, which is sung the Hymn of the Fuencisla, and the last Sunday in the Virgin returned to his shrine. Since the Virgin is Captain General of Artillery (which is indicated for the baton and the sash that has his feet) from the September 24, 1916, en route from the Cathedral Shrine and is accompanied by cadets Artillery Academy and the Band (which has to be brought from the Academy of Toledo since disappeared local). In its trip between the Sanctuary to the cathedral is accompanied by the Cadets to Plaza del Azoguejo, where they sing a Salve. Until a few years had exhibitions in Castilian Jotas in the Alameda de la Fuencisla in the arrival of the Virgin; but recently Castilian Jotas are danced in the Azoguejo own.

Holy Week

Segovia has 10 fraternities, which are:

 Oración en el Huerto (neighbourhood of San Lorenzo)
 Resurrección del Señor (neighbourhood of Nueva Segovia)
 Cristo con la cruz a Cuestas (ADEMAR association)
 Santo Cristo de la Cruz (neighbourhood of Cristo del Mercado)
 Santo Cristo de San Marcos (neighbourhood of San Marcos)
 Soledad al pie de la Cruz (neighbourhood of San Millán)
 Nuestra Señora de la Piedad (neighbourhood of San José)
 Real Cofradía de la Santa Esclavitud (neighbourhood of El Salvador)
 Feligresía de San Andrés (neighbourhood of San Andrés)
 Soledad Dolorosa (neighbourhood of Santa Eulalia)

Legends 
There are many due to the longevity of the city, among the main ones are:

 Legend of the construction of the aqueduct by the devil;
 Legend of the rooks and the Church of Vera Cruz;
 Legend of María del Salto, a Jewess saved by the Virgin when she was going to fall off the cliff in La Fuencisla;
 Legend of the good bandit of the 19th century El Tuerto de Pirón;
 Legend of the street of Death and Life during the Comunera Revolution;
 Legend of the La Mujer Muerta mountain;
 Legend of the House of Crime, in the San Millán neighborhood;
 Legend of the Academy of Artillery about the ghost of a young medieval friar;
 Legend of the prince and the aya (caretaker) about the fall of the infant Pedro, 12-year-old son of Enrique II through a window of the alcázar.
 Legend of Alfonso X El Sabio about God's punishment of his heresies.

There are also other different legends in the incorporated neighborhoods.

Notable people
Víctor Barrio (bullfighter)
Juan Bravo (rebel)
Pedro Delgado (cyclist)
Juan Valdivia (guitarist of Héroes del Silencio)
Andrés Laguna (humanist physician, pharmacologist and botanist)
Arsenio Martínez-Campos (military officer)
Manuel Pérez Brunicardi (ski mountaineer)
Cayetano Redondo Aceña (politician, typographer and journalist)
Elvira Sastre (poet)
Don Abraham Senior Coronel
Antonio Machado (poet)

Twin towns – sister cities
Segovia is twinned with:
 Gangdong-gu, Seoul, South Korea (2001)
 Navalcarnero, Community of Madrid, Spain (1999)
 San Bartolomé de Tirajana, Gran Canaria, Spain (1996)
 Tours, Centre-Val de Loire, France (1972)
 Pleven, Pleven Province, Bulgaria
 Lal-lo, Cagayan, Philippines

Antipode
Segovia is the Antipode of Masterton, New Zealand.

See also
 Infante Jaime, Duke of Segovia (1908–1975), Legitimist claimant to the French throne

Footnotes and references 
Footnotes

References

External links

 
 Official tourism office of Segovia
 Official Language Schools of Segovia 
 Segovia photo and video essay Part I and Part II
 Segovia city guide at HitchHikers Handbook
 More than a Roman aqueduct – 10 reasons to visit Segovia city